Kyauk Mi is a town in Mandalay Division,  Burma situated 15.2 km East of Mandalay. The town is first settlement on National Highway 3 after Mandalay.

Populated places in Mandalay Region
Mandalay Region